Pasak may refer to:

 Pasak, Iran, a village in Sistan and Baluchestan Province
 Pasak, West Azerbaijan, a village in West Azerbaijan Province
 Yawara

See also
Pa Sak (disambiguation)